Barnum's St. Louis Hotel was a historic 6-floor hotel built in 1854.  The Barnums were a family of hotel keepers who had run the famous Barnum's Hotel in Baltimore.  This building was located at the 2nd and Walnut Streets in St. Louis, Missouri, and has been considered to be St. Louis' first high-rise building.  The hotel was designed by architect George I. Barnett.

The famous former slave Dred Scott worked as a porter here from 1857 until his death.  Dred Scott's new owners had freed him two months after the U.S. Supreme Court decision. Scott became a local celebrity, greeting visitors at the hotel until he died of tuberculosis on September 17, 1858.

Famous guests included Henry Clay and Illinois Governor Richard Yates.

The hotel was demolished in 1890.

References

Hotel buildings completed in 1854
Hotels established in 1854
Hotels in Missouri
Buildings and structures in St. Louis
Demolished buildings and structures in St. Louis
Buildings and structures demolished in 1890
1854 establishments in Missouri